Astathes gemmula is a species of beetle in the family Cerambycidae. It was described by Thomson in 1865. It is known from Sulawesi.

References

G
Beetles described in 1865